The 1969 season was the 86th season of regional competitive association football in Australia.

National teams

Australia national soccer team

Results and fixtures

Friendlies

1970 FIFA World Cup qualification

First round
</onlyinclude>

Second round

Final round

League competitions

See also
 Soccer in Australia

References

Seasons in Australian soccer
1969 in Australian sport
Australian soccer by year
Australian soccer